The Buick Velite 6 (微蓝) is a compact station wagon, also known as a "multi-activity vehicle" (MAV) built by Chinese-American manufacturer SAIC-GM under the Buick brand. It is available as either an electric car or a plug-in hybrid (PHEV). It is sold exclusively in China.

History

The Velite 6 was previewed with the Velite concept car in 2016 (not to be confused with the 2004 concept of the same name).  In April 2018, two production-intent models were unveiled; one electric, and the other a plug-in hybrid. The production Buick Velite 6 debuted at the 2019 Shanghai Auto Show in April.  At first, it was only available as an all-electric vehicle, with two battery options available. In July 2020, the production plug-in hybrid version was launched.

The Velite 6 is available in three variants: Entry, Middle, and Luxury. It also features three driving modes (standard, sport, and economy) and three levels of energy recycling.

Velite 6 Plus
The Buick Velite 6 Plus was introduced in October 2019.

Velite 6 EV (2022)
In November 2021, Buick introduced an updated version of the original and Plus models, called the Velite 6 EV to distinguish it from the plug-in hybrid (PHEV). Other changes included an update to Buick's eConnect infotainment system with 10-inch screen, new wheel design, and an updated front bumper/grille design.

Plug-in hybrid

The Buick Velite 6 PHEV combines a 1.5-liter  internal combustion engine with an  electric motor, driven by an electronically controlled variable transmission (e-CVT). Together, they produce  and  torque. The Velite 6 PHEV includes a "lock" mode which keeps the car on hybrid power for maximum range.

See also 
Chevrolet Menlo
List of modern production plug-in electric vehicles
New energy vehicles in China
Plug-in electric vehicle

References

External links

  

Velite 6
Production electric cars
Plug-in hybrid vehicles
Buick Velite 6
2020s cars
Compact cars
Hatchbacks
Cars of China